The Avon School District is a public school district in Bon Homme County, based in Avon, South Dakota.

Schools
The Avon School District has one elementary school, one middle school, and one high school.

Elementary school
Avon Elementary School

Middle school
Avon Middle School

High school
Avon High School

References

External links
Avon School District

School districts in South Dakota